Events in the year 1811 in India.

Events
 National income - 13,863 million

Law
East India Company Bonds Act (British statute)

Births
Daya Shankar Kaul Nasim, poet (died 1845).

Deaths

 
India
Years of the 19th century in India